Ibeh is a surname. Notable people with the surname include:

Bruno Ibeh (born 1995), Nigerian footballer
Buchie Ibeh (born 1983), American football player
John Ibeh (born 1986), Nigerian footballer
Prince Ibeh (born 1994), British-Rwandan basketball player